Rachel Jones may refer to:

Rachel Jones (artist) (born 1991), British artist
Rachel Jones (BMX rider) (born 1995), Australian BMX rider
Rachel Bay Jones (born 1969), American stage actress and singer
Rachel Jones (Maryland politician) (born 1984), member of the Maryland House of Delegates
Rachel Jones (Arizona politician), member of the Arizona House of Representatives
 Rachel Leah Jones (born 1970), American-Israeli documentary film director and producer
Rachel Jones Koresh, née Rachel Jones
Rachel Jones (radio presenter), the producer of The Chris Moyles Show
Rachel Jones, namesake of Rachel, West Virginia
Rachel Jones (singer), in the bands The Haywains and Karnataka 
Rachel Jones (biathle), who competes in modern biathlon
Rachel Jones, fictional writer of Coffee, Tea or Me?
Rachel Jones (Neighbours), fictional character on Australian soap opera Neighbours